Tara Lyn Hart is the debut album by Canadian country music artist Tara Lyn Hart. It was released by Epic Records on October 5, 1999. The album peaked at number 30 on the RPM Country Albums chart.

Track listing
"Stuff That Matters" – 3:28
"One Heart" – 3:38
"Save Me" – 2:54
"What He Used to Do" – 3:34
"Mine All Mine" – 3:22
"You Can Get There from Here" – 3:25
"That's When You Came Along" – 4:06
"Hearts and Arrows" – 4:07
"You Again" – 3:56
"Baby, What About You" – 3:15
"A Rose Is a Rose" – 4:03
"Love Ought to Work That Way" – 3:03
"Greatest Story" – 3:34
"I Will Be Loving You" – 3:31

Charts

References

1999 debut albums
Tara Lyn Hart albums
Epic Records albums